Waterfront Park is a park along San Francisco's Embarcadero, near Pier 39, in the U.S. state of California. The park, established in 1976, is owned by the Port Authority. The park is home to the Skygate sculpture.

See also
 List of parks in San Francisco

References

External links

 

1976 establishments in California
Parks in San Francisco
North Beach, San Francisco
Fisherman's Wharf, San Francisco